Geldart is a surname, and may refer to:

 Callum Geldart (born 1991), English cricketer
 Clarence Geldart (1867–1935), American film actor
 Gary Geldart (born 1950), American ice hockey player
 Stanley Geldart (1919–1983), Canadian politician
 Tom Geldart (1905–1985), English footballer
 William Martin Geldart (1870–1922), British jurist